Born into Trouble as the Sparks Fly Upward is the second album by the Canadian band The Silver Mt. Zion Memorial Orchestra & Tra-La-La Band. It was released by Constellation Records in October 2001.

The title is drawn from the Book of Job: "Yet man is born unto trouble, as the sparks fly upwards" (5:7). It could also be taken from Jerome K. Jerome's Three Men in a Boat, where the same passage is paraphrased.

"This Gentle Hearts Like Shot Bird's Fallen" was used in the climax to the David Gordon Green film Snow Angels.

The album finds the band expanding from three members to six, with a similarly expanded name.

Track listing

Personnel 
The Silver Mt. Zion Memorial Orchestra and Tra-la-la Band
 Thierry Amar – contrabass, vocals
 Beckie Foon – cello
 Ian Ilavsky – guitar, organ
 Efrim Menuck – guitar, piano, vocals, tapes, effects
 Jessica Moss – violin, vocals
 Sophie Trudeau – violin, vocals

Other musicians
 Eric Craven – drums
 Jonah Fortune – trumpet, trombone on "C'mon Come on (Loose an Endless Longing)"
 Mischa and Sara – voices

Technical
 Howard Bilerman – production
 Harris Newman – mastering

References

External links 
 Constellation's album information page

2001 albums
Thee Silver Mt. Zion albums
Constellation Records (Canada) albums
Albums produced by Howard Bilerman